Character.org is a nonprofit organization that encourages people of all ages to practice good ethical values. Formerly known as the Character Education Partnership, it was founded in 1993. Today, Character.org creates and shares resources that support people around the globe, including their 11 Principles Framework for Schools: A Guide to Cultivating a Culture of Character. Their vision is to serve as the hub for all things character by inspiring, recognizing and celebrating thousands of people in schools and beyond who are champions for character.

It is a "nonprofit, nonpartisan, nonsectarian, coalition of organizations and individuals committed to fostering effective character education in our nation's K-12 schools." Character.org's mission is "Leading the nation in helping schools develop people of good character for a just and compassionate society." A commentary in the November 14, 2007 edition of Education Week stated that "Just about anything can be called character education these days", whereas "Schools serious about helping students form good character rely heavily on Character.org's 11 Principles of Effective Character Education."

Character.org is an umbrella organization for character education, encouraging schools to create educational environments that foster ethical, responsible, and caring young people. The organization works with schools, districts, and states to foster core ethical values such as caring, honesty, fairness, responsibility, and respect for self and others. Rather than instructing schools and districts to use a particular set of core values in their character education initiative, Character.org leads key stakeholders in these organizations through the process of consensus-building. They help schools and districts determine the core values that best suit their needs as learning communities.

Through its National Schools of Character Awards program, Character.org recognizes public and private schools and districts (K-12) as National Schools of Character for their outstanding achievements in character education. Winning schools and districts receive a grant, which they are required to use both to continue their character education program and to conduct outreach to other schools working to implement quality character education. Schools are selected as winners based on their efforts to implement character education programs that include Character.org's "Eleven Principles of Effective Character Education" and provide a useful example for other schools to follow. 

States offering character education programs have worked together with Character.org to establish new programs and to recognize achievements in the area, with New Jersey's Governor noting the organization's efforts to help "young people to learn honesty, respect and responsibility". In September 2007, the Massachusetts Department of Education announced that it was working with the Partnership to recognize "outstanding work in character education".

References

External links
Character.org website

Non-profit organizations based in Washington, D.C.

